Charles Edward "Joe" Blewitt (1 November 1895 – 30 May 1954) was a British runner, who won Midland Championships over distances ranging from 880 yd to 10 miles. He was English national and international champion in cross-country running, and competed for Great Britain at the 1920 and 1928 Olympics. In 1920 he finished fifth in the 3000 m and 5000 m, earning a silver medal in the 3000 m team event. In 1928 he failed to reach the final of the 3000 m steeplechase. He withdrew from the 1924 Olympic steeplechase race due to an injury.

References

1895 births
1954 deaths
People from Upton-upon-Severn
English male long-distance runners
English male middle-distance runners
Olympic athletes of Great Britain
Olympic silver medallists for Great Britain
Athletes (track and field) at the 1920 Summer Olympics
Athletes (track and field) at the 1928 Summer Olympics
International Cross Country Championships winners
Medalists at the 1920 Summer Olympics
Olympic silver medalists in athletics (track and field)
English male steeplechase runners
Sportspeople from Worcestershire